Davenport House may refer to:

United Kingdom
Davenport House, Duntisbourne Abbots, Gloucestershire, England
Davenport House, Worfield, Shropshire, England

United States
Davenport House (Franklin Township, Michigan)
Davenport House (New Rochelle, New York)
Davenport House (Creswell, North Carolina)
Davenport House (Greer, South Carolina)
Hanford Davenport House, New Canaan, Connecticut
Deacon John Davenport House, Stamford, Connecticut
Isaiah Davenport House, Savannah, Georgia
Davenport-Bradfield House, Sheridan, Indiana
Lispenard-Rodman-Davenport House, New Rochelle, New York